Romeo (Telugu: రోమియో) is a 2014 Telugu drama film starring Sairam Shankar and Adonika in the lead, directed by Gopiganesh Pattabhi. Valluripalli Ramesh produced this movie under the Maharshi Cinema Banner and Sunil Kashyap provided the music for the film. The film released after much delay.

Cast
 Sairam Shankar as Kittu 
 Adonika as Madhoo 
 Subbaraju
 Pragathi
 Ali
 Ravi Teja as himself (cameo appearance)

Production
The film is set in Verona, the same place where Shakespeare's drama Romeo and Juliet was set. A majority of the film was shot in Europe.

Soundtrack 
The songs are composed by Sunil Kashyap. Lyrics by Viswa, Bhaskarabhatla, Paidisetty Ram and Sunil Kashyap.
"Aajaa Aajaa" - Sravana Bhargavi
"Ee Ammaiyil Antha" - Sunil Kashyap
"Pranamaa" - Sunil Kashyap
"Neelo Neelo" - Alfans
"Naalo Cheragani" - Karthik, Ranjith
"Romeo Rocks" - Sunil Kashyap

Reception 
A critic from The Times of India wrote that "Ten minutes into the story, there are hints that the film is beyond redemption and it continues to tumble down the rabbit hole".

References

2010s Telugu-language films
2014 films